The Dummy is a 1929 American comedy film directed by Robert Milton and written by Harriet Ford, Harvey J. O'Higgins, Herman J. Mankiewicz and Joseph L. Mankiewicz. The film stars Fredric March, John Cromwell, Fred Kohler, Mickey Bennett, Vondell Darr, Jack Oakie and ZaSu Pitts. The film was released on March 9, 1929, by Paramount Pictures.

Cast 
Ruth Chatterton as Agnes Meredith
Fredric March as Trumbull Meredith
John Cromwell as Walter Babbing
Fred Kohler as Joe Cooper
Mickey Bennett as Barney Cook
Vondell Darr as Peggy Meredith
Jack Oakie as Dopey Hart
ZaSu Pitts	as Rose Gleason
Richard Tucker as Blackie Baker
Eugene Pallette as Madison

References 

3. page 455 Ruth Chatterton - Actress, Aviator, Author, by Scott O'Brien (BearManor c.2013)

External links 
 

1929 films
1920s English-language films
American comedy films
1929 comedy films
Paramount Pictures films
American black-and-white films
Films directed by Robert Milton
1920s American films